Handeh-ye Rabi (also Romanized as Handeh-ye Rābī) is a village in Kish Rural District, Kish District, Bandar Lengeh County, Hormozgan Province, Iran. At the 2006 census, its population was 79, in 9 families.  The village is located on Hendurabi Island.

References 

Populated places in Bandar Lengeh County